The black-backed tody-flycatcher (Poecilotriccus pulchellus) is a species of bird in the family Tyrannidae, and one of twelve in the genus Poecilotriccus.

Distribution and habitat
It is endemic to Peru.  Its natural habitat is subtropical or tropical moist lowland forests.

References

black-backed tody-flycatcher
Birds of Peru
Birds of the Yungas
black-backed tody-flycatcher
black-backed tody-flycatcher
Taxonomy articles created by Polbot